Stretford is a town in the Metropolitan Borough of Trafford, Greater Manchester, England.  The town contains 20 listed buildings that are recorded in the National Heritage List for England.  All the listed buildings are designated at Grade II, the lowest of the three grades, which is applied to "buildings of national importance and special interest".  The town is adjacent to the centre of Manchester, and is partly residential and partly industrial.  The Bridgewater Canal and the Manchester Ship Canal run through the town, and there are listed buildings associated with both canals.  The other listed buildings include two medieval structures, churches, the entrances to a former botanical garden and to a park, a factory, civic buildings, a former cinema, a hotel, and three war memorials.


Buildings

References

Citations

Sources

Lists of listed buildings in Greater Manchester
Listed